Haas is a family of rocket space launchers developed by ARCAspace for the Google Lunar X Prize competition and for their national crewed space program.  no rocket has been launched, the planned rocket types changed significantly over time.

It was named after Conrad Haas, a medieval rocket pioneer who lived and worked in what is now Romania, and was the first person to describe a multistage rocket in writing.

Haas 
Haas was a Romanian carrier rocket, which was developed by ARCA as part of the ELE programme. It was designed to be air-launched from a high-altitude balloon, similar to the American Rockoon experiments of the 1950s. Prior to the development of Haas, ARCA had already launched two Stabilo rockets from balloons. It is fueled by hydrogen peroxide and bitumen.

The Haas rocket was to be a three-stage rocket intended to be capable of placing 400 kilograms of payload into low Earth orbit. Its maiden flight was to carry the European Lunar Explorer spacecraft, ARCA's entry into the Google Lunar X-Prize, following a series of engine tests which began in 2009.

It was abandoned when ARCA decided to stop using solar and helium balloons for their space program.

Haas 2 

Haas 2 was an orbital two-stage launcher design intended to be carried under the fuselage of the IAR 111 supersonic plane. It was planned to be powered by the new Executor liquid-fueled rocket engine under development at ARCA. It was intended to place a  payload into low Earth orbit.

Haas 2CA 

Haas 2CA, previously Haas 2c, was a planned flight testing platform for the Executor engine. It was an intended single-stage-to-orbit vehicle due to its lightweight fuel tanks and was originally planned for a 2018 launch.

2020 plans 
ARCAspace changed the plans of future rockets over time. As of March 2020, the company plans to develop ground-launched single-stage-to-orbit rockets which can optionally increase their payload with a booster stage (called Launch assist system, LAS). It is planned to test two stages of a small orbital rocket (LAS 25R and Haas mini) in independent flights in 2020, before the two are combined for a first orbital flight in 2021. This two-stage rocket is planned to have a payload capacity of 40 kg to low Earth orbit. A larger first stage is expected for 2022, followed by a single-stage-to-orbit rocket Haas 3 in 2023, carrying up to 500 kg of payload. Combining both, ARCAspace expects to achieve a payload capacity of 3 tonnes in 2024. This sequence would repeat with even larger rocket stages, leading to a 60 tonne payload rocket in 2027.

See also
Aerobee
Pegasus
 Comparison of orbital launchers families

References

External Pages

Air launch to orbit
ARCAspace